Needle Peak may refer to:

 Needle Peak (Antarctica)
 In Canada:
 Needle Peak (Alberta)
 Needle Peak (British Columbia)
 In the United States:
 Needle Peak (Coronation Island), Alaska
 Needle Peak (Arizona)
 Needle Peak (Inyo County, California)
 Needle Peak (Placer County, California)
 Needle Peak (Bonneville County, Idaho)
 Needle Peak (Shoshone County, Idaho)
 Needle Peak (Montana)
 Needle Peak (Nevada)
 Needle Peak (Brewster County, Texas)
 Needle Peak (Jeff Davis County, Texas)
 Needle Peak (Presidio County, Texas)
 Needle Peak (Washington)
 Needle Peak (Wyoming)